Paul Israel Sparer (December 19, 1923 – November 19, 1999) was an American character actor.

Career 
Sparer appeared as Rex Cooper in the soap operas Somerset and Another World. He was also known for narrating the anthology TV series Tales from the Darkside. His film roles include Loving and The House on Carroll Street while television appearances include Armstrong Circle Theatre, Kojak, The Adams Chronicles, Lou Grant and Spenser: For Hire. He also appeared in the first episode of Law & Order, "Prescription for Death".

Personal life 
Sparer was born in Boston, Massachusetts. He was married to actress Nancy Marchand. Sparer died in Manhattan in 1999.

Filmography

References

External links

Paul Sparer at Aveleyman

1923 births
1999 deaths
20th-century American male actors
American male soap opera actors
Male actors from Boston